Solo (Pisa) 1982 is a live album by composer and saxophonist Anthony Braxton featuring a solo performance recorded in Italy in 1982 and first released on the Golden Years of New Jazz label in 2007.

Reception

The Allmusic review by François Couture stated: "Simply put, Braxton is on fire ... The atmosphere throughout the performance is unlike most avant-garde jazz recordings; then again, even by Braxton's standards, this album is also unlike most avant-garde jazz recordings. Highly recommended to fans, newcomers, saxophone students, and people who still think this kind of stuff appeals to no one." Jazz Review's Glenn Astarita said: "Overall, this program should enthrall Braxton’s legion of admirers while residing as a significant edition to his extensive discography. (Essential.... )."

Track listing
All compositions by Anthony Braxton except where noted.

 "Composition 26c" - 4:45
 "Composition 106c" - 4:25
 "Composition 106n" - 3:41
 "Composition 26g +99g" - 4:20
 "Composition 118a" - 4:22
 "Alone Together" (Arthur Schwartz, Howard Dietz) - 5:17
 "Composition 77e" - 4:16
 "'Round 'Bout Midnight" (Thelonious Monk, Cootie Williams, Bernie Hanighen) - 4:45
 "Composition 119j" - 4:12
 "You Go to My Head" (J. Fred Coots, Haven Gillespie) - 3:49
 "Giant Steps" (John Coltrane) - 11:11

Personnel
Anthony Braxton- alto saxophone

References

Leo Records live albums
Anthony Braxton live albums
2007 live albums